A universal integration platform is a development- and/or configuration-time analog of a universal server. The emphasis on the term: "platform" implies a middleware environment from which integration oriented solutions are derived. Likewise, the term: "Universal" implies depth and breadth of integration capabilities that transcend disparate operating systems, protocols, APIs, Data Sources, Programming Languages, Composite Processes, Discrete Services, and Monolithic Applications.

Related Technologies
 Service Oriented Architecture (SOA)
 Integration platform
 Enterprise Service Bus (ESB)
 Web Services
 Business Process Management
 Business Activity Monitoring
 Enterprise Information Integration (EII)

Relevant Protocols
 WebDAV
 HTTP
 SOAP
 UDDI
 SMTP
 POP3
 IMAP
 NNTP
 m-BizMaker

Relevant Data Access APIs
 ODBC
 JDBC
 ADO.NET
 OLE DB

Typical Data Sources
 SQL
 XML exposed via URIs
 Free Text

Universal Integration Platform Solutions
 Virtuoso Universal Server from OpenLink Software
 Prova

Enterprise application integration